Michael Busto (born June 20, 1986) is a Canadian former professional ice hockey defenceman. He most recently played for Ducs d'Angers of the French Ligue Magnus.

Playing career
Busto was born, in Burnaby, British Columbia. Busto played in the Western Hockey League with the Swift Current Broncos, Kootenay Ice, and Moose Jaw Warriors.

On April 27, 2007, Busto signed with the New York Rangers to a three-year, entry-level contract. Busto was then assigned to Rangers affiliate, the Charlotte Checkers of the ECHL.

Busto spent two seasons with the Checkers before on June 30, 2009, he was traded by the Rangers, along with Scott Gomez and Tom Pyatt, to the Montreal Canadiens for Chris Higgins, Ryan McDonagh, Doug Janik and Pavel Valentenko.

After completion of his entry-level contract, Busto was released as a free agent by the Canadiens to briefly play in 9 games with the Elmira Jackals during the 2009–10 season. He belatedly signed a one-year deal in Europe with Italian club, HC Bolzano of the Serie A on December 27, 2010. Busto played in 12 games for Bolzano before returning to the familiar ECHL for the following 2011–12 season with the Las Vegas Wranglers. Busto enjoyed his most successful season in the ECHL playing in a career high 65 games and contributing to the Wranglers playoff run as Kelly Cup finalists.

On June 25, 2012, Busto returned to Europe to sign an initial one-year contract with French club Ducs d'Angers of the Ligue Magnus. In the 2012–13 season with the Owls, Busto led the team from the blueline in scoring with 14 points in 26 games. He was signed to a two-year contract extension on May 7, 2013.

Career statistics

References

External links

1986 births
Living people
Bolzano HC players
Charlotte Checkers (1993–2010) players
Dayton Gems players
Ducs d'Angers players
Elmira Jackals (ECHL) players
Ice hockey people from British Columbia
Kootenay Ice players
Las Vegas Wranglers players
Moose Jaw Warriors players
Sportspeople from Burnaby
Swift Current Broncos players
Canadian ice hockey defencemen